John Ulric Nef may refer to:
John Ulric Nef (chemist) (1862–1915), American chemist
John Ulric Nef (economic historian) (1899–1988), American economic historian